Ariel Shearer (c. 1905 – ?) was an Australian composer and classical pianist.

She learned piano under William Silver (born March 1878), who also trained Elder Scholars Merle Robertson, John Bishop, Miriam Hyde and Ruth Naylor.

She left Adelaide in 1924 to study at the Royal College of Music. On her departure for London, Charles Cawthorne organised a benefit concert for her in the Adelaide Town Hall, which featured William Silver, George Pearce, Charles Schilsky, Harold S. Parsons, Harold Wylde FRCO, Vera Thrush AMUA, Hilda Gill AMUA, F. Stone, and basso Richard Watkins. She returned to Adelaide three years later, and was reported as having appreciated the experience, but was handicapped by a shortage of money and having to board with a family who were not musically inclined.

In 1931, she and Charlotte Grivell (mezzo-soprano), a fellow student in London, were appointed choral liaison commissioners for Girl Guides in South Australia. The two held joint concerts during the ensuing decade then appear to have retired from the stage. They were also keen equestrians, and neither married. Her sister, Charlotte Annie "Lottie" Creedy, née Shearer, (12 December 1894– ), was a successful piano teacher.

Compositions
The Lady of Shalott, a song first performed by Charlotte Grivell and Ariel Shearer in 1928
The Beacon, a song composed for Elsie Woolley to perform at the 1930 Ballarat competitions.
Ode of Welcome, first performed by 1,000 Girl Guides for Lady Baden-Powell for her visit in 1931
Bush Singing, Camp Fire and Green Frog, Girl Guide campfire songs, to words by Thelma Smith.
Silver, which, sung by Vivian Axford, won the Australian composition prize at the Bendigo competitions in 1937.

References 

1900s births
Year of death missing
Australian classical composers
Australian classical pianists
Australian women pianists
Australian women classical composers
Women classical pianists